Dr. Knugelmeister is the debut album by Swedish punk rock band Komplett Arnold. It was recorded in April to May 1991 and was released the same year. The album was remastered in 1998. The no longer available MC edition contained lyrics and fan photos in black and white.

Track listing
(All songs are written by Komplett Arnold except where noted)

Cassette

Side A

"On the Edge"
"Gruesome Sunday Morning"
"That's Just the Way It Is"
"Crazy World"
"California Sun"
"House of Insanity"
"I Wanna Be A Susaphone"
"The Beauty Is In the Beholders Eyes"
"Kill the Bandits"
"Death of Me"
"Blitzkrieg Bop" (Dee Dee Ramone, Tommy Ramone)

Side B

"Shotgun Maniac"
"That's What I Call Rock'N Roll"
"Eat It"
"Time Bomb"
"Through the Desert"
"Turn Off the News"
"Cold Mind"
"Through the Town"
"To the Sky"
"Börjes Moppe"

CD

"On the Edge"
"Gruesome Sunday Morning"
"That's Just the Way It Is"
"Crazy World"
"California Sun"
"House of Insanity"
"I Wanna Be A Susaphone"
"The Beauty Is In the Beholders Eyes"
"Kill the Bandits"
"Death of Me"
"Blitzkrieg Bop" (Dee Dee Ramone, Tommy Ramone)
"Shotgun Maniac"
"That's What I Call Rock'N Roll"
"Eat It"
"Time Bomb"
"Through the Desert"
"Turn Off the News"
"Through the Town"
"To the Sky"
"Börjes Moppe"
"Selling Dogfood" (bonus track)
"Norberg Blues" (bonus track)

Personnel
Per Findahl – guitar
Fredrik Findahl – guitar, vocals
Daniel Wiik – bass, vocals
Fredrik Haglund - drums

1991 debut albums